Zartech Farms (established 1983) is a large farm based in Ibadan, Nigeria which specialises in poultry farming and meat processing production. The company was founded by Raymond Assad Zard. Zartech belongs to the ZARD group of companies which also operates, Kopek Construction Limited, Vina International Limited, Ibadan International School, Sweetco Foods Limited.

History 
In 1983, Raymond Assad Zard  started the poultry business in the city of his birth after his father's successful business as a cocoa merchant,

References

External links
 

Farms in Nigeria
Companies based in Ibadan
1983 establishments in Nigeria
Companies established in 1983
Poultry farming in Nigeria